Nothocasis is a genus of moths in the family Geometridae described by Prout in 1936.

Species
Nothocasis bellaria (Leech, 1897)
Nothocasis sertata (Hübner, 1817)

References

Trichopterygini